The Seychellois records in swimming are the fastest ever performances of swimmers from Seychelles, which are recognised and ratified by the Seychelles Swimming Association.

All records were set in finals unless noted otherwise.

Long Course (50 m)

Men

Women

Mixed relay

Short Course (25 m)

Men

Women

Mixed relay

References

Seychelles
Records
Swimming